Ljudmilena is a genus of gastropods belonging to the family Enidae.

The species of this genus are found at the coast of Black Sea.

Species:

Ljudmilena araxena 
Ljudmilena bayburti 
Ljudmilena callosa 
Ljudmilena cespita 
Ljudmilena euxina 
Ljudmilena excellens 
Ljudmilena mariannae 
Ljudmilena sieversi 
Ljudmilena tricollis

References

Gastropods